Aphelenchoidinae is a nematode subfamily in the family Aphelenchoididae.

References

External links 

Aphelenchoididae
Protostome subfamilies